Brian Goggin is an Irish banker and former CEO of the Bank of Ireland, Ireland's second largest bank.

He took over from Michael Soden in June 2004. He was due to retire in summer 2009 after forty years with Bank of Ireland. He instead retired in February 2009, two days before the Bank of Ireland robbery by which time Richie Boucher had replaced him.

After the crash, Goggin has joined US private equity firm Apollo Management an adviser.

He is also a Board Member of the Irish Heart Foundation.

References

Place of birth missing (living people)
Year of birth missing (living people)
Living people
Post-2008 Irish economic downturn
Irish bankers
Irish chief executives